Roberto Antonio Lange (born April 22, 1963) is the Chief United States district judge of the United States District Court for the District of South Dakota.

Early life and education 

Born in Pamplona, Spain, Lange was raised on a family farm near Madison, South Dakota. Lange earned a Bachelor of Arts degree from the University of South Dakota in 1985 where he graduated magna cum laude as a University Scholar having received the McGovern-Abourezk Human Rights Award. He attended Northwestern University School of Law and received his Juris Doctor in 1988, cum laude. During his time at law school, Lange worked as an editor and board member for the Northwestern University Law Review, represented the law school on the Jessup International Moot Court team and board, and graduated with the Order of the Coif distinction as within the top ten percent of his class.

Legal career 

After graduating law school, Lange worked as a law clerk in 1988 and 1989 for United States District Judge Donald Porter, who was Chief Judge for the District of South Dakota at the time. Lange then joined the law firm Davenport, Evans, Hurwitz & Smith in Sioux Falls, South Dakota, in 1989. Lange became a partner in 1993, and later served as the head of the firm's litigation section. Lange specialized in complex commercial litigation, products liability and significant injury cases, class action and ERISA litigation. During his twenty years with the firm, he handled business disputes for individuals, small businesses, and nationally known clients. Lange tried over fifty cases to verdict while in private practice.

Rhines v. Weber 

In 2005, Lange argued the case of Rhines v. Weber in front of the Supreme Court of the United States. As court-appointed counsel for a death-row inmate, he presented the issue of whether a federal court may stay a section 2254 habeas corpus petition which included exhausted and unexhausted claims. The Supreme Court ruled in favor of Lange's client, by a 9–0 vote, reversed the Court of Appeals for the Eighth Circuit, and allowed the district court to stay Rhines' petition. Ultimately, in 2019, Rhines was executed.

Federal judicial service 

Upon the recommendation of U.S. Senator Tim Johnson, President Barack Obama nominated Lange to a vacant seat on the United States District Court for the District of South Dakota on July 8, 2009 that had been created by Judge Charles B. Kornmann taking senior status. The American Bar Association Standing Committee on the Judicial Nominations voted unanimously to rate Lange as "well qualified." The United States Senate Committee on the Judiciary reported Lange's nomination to the full Senate on October 1, 2009. The full Senate confirmed Lange by a vote of 100–0 on October 21, 2009, and he received his commission the same day. He became Chief Judge on January 1, 2020.

Tenure 
On June 2, 2021, Lange ruled against South Dakota Governor Kristi Noem's efforts to have fireworks at Mt. Rushmore, finding four of the five reasons given by the National Park Service and Department of the Interior Secretary Deb Haaland were valid. In so ruling, Lange characterized the idea as "appealing" because the country "could use a good celebration of its foundational principles of democracy, liberty and equal protection of the law," but noted that the Court was not "called upon to determine whether such a fireworks display is a good idea" in upholding the administrative decision to not issue the permit the Governor had requested. 

In March of 2020, Lange interpreted the 1868 Treaty of Fort Laramie in light of congressional enactments and the federal government's trust obligation to American Indian tribes to require the federal government to provide the Rosebud Sioux Tribe with "competent physician-led health care" in a suit that followed the Indian Health Services having close the emergency department of the lone medical facility on the reservation. Lange however ruled that the State of South Dakota, and not the Cheyenne River Sioux Tribe, was granted the statutory right to set the speed limit on a United States Highway crossing through a reservation. Before the 2022 election, Lange granted a preliminary injunction on a showing that Lyman County in South Dakota had violated the Voting Rights Act by their five at-large commissioner districts, which had prevented the Lower Brule Sioux Tribe, though constituting 40% of the county's population, from ever electing a county commissioner.  Lange ultimately allowed the 2022 election of commissioners to proceed under a plan that resolved the Voting Rights Act violation by 2024. 

In April of 2020, Lange issued a 106-page decision finding that five of six plaintiffs who had been forcibly catheterized at the direction of South Dakota law enforcement had viable claims for violation of their Fourth Amendment protections against unreasonable searches and seizures. Lange wrote that "Defendants' need to obtain plaintiffs' urine to prove low-level drug crimes did not justify subjecting the plaintiffs to involuntary catheterization, a highly invasive--and in these cases--degrading medical procedure."

Testimony

Lange in February 2014 testified before the United States Sentencing Commission on implementation of the Violence Against Women Act of 2013. Lange's criminal case load is the highest among federal judges for Native American defendants and violent crime from reservations. Lange served on the national Tribal Issues Advisory Group, and testified before the Sentencing Commission in July 2016 concerning the report of the Tribal Issues Advisory Group.

References

External links

1963 births
Judges of the United States District Court for the District of South Dakota
Living people
Northwestern University Pritzker School of Law alumni
People from Madison, South Dakota
People from Pamplona
United States district court judges appointed by Barack Obama
21st-century American judges
University of South Dakota alumni